At the 1956 Winter Olympics, two bobsleigh events were contested.

Medal summary

Participating nations

Medal table

References

External links
1956 bobsleigh two-man results
1956 bobsleigh four-man results

 
1956 Winter Olympics
1956 Winter Olympics events
Olympics
Bobsleigh in Italy